Joanne Arnott (born 16 December 1960 in Winnipeg, Manitoba) is a Canadian writer.

She has conducted writing workshops across much of Canada and in Australia, including a series at the Carnegie Centre, sponsored by SFU, and has written for the Literary Review of Canada. She received the Gerald Lampert Award for her 1991 collection of poetry Wiles of Girlhood.

Arnott lives in British Columbia with her family.  She is a founding member of the Aboriginal Writers Collective West Coast and The Aunties Collective. As a member of the Alliance of Women Against Racism, Etc., she facilitated Unlearning Racism workshops for colleges, universities, government and community groups in Canada throughout the 1990s. She has served on The Writers Union of Canada National Council (2009), The Writers Trust of Canada Authors Committee, and as jury member for the Governor General's Awards/Poetry (2011). She is the Poetry Editor for Event Magazine.

Bibliography

Poetry
Wiles of Girlhood (Press Gang, 1991)
My Grass Cradle (Press Gang, 1992)
Steepy Mountain: love poetry (Kegedonce, 2004)
Mother Time: Poems New & Selected (Ronsdale, 2007)
Longing: Four Poems on diverse matters (Rubicon, chapbook with Aaron Paquette, 2008)
The Family of Crow (Leaf Press, chapbook with various artists, 2012)
A Night for the Lady (Ronsdale, 2013)
Halfling Spring: an internet romance (Kegedonce, 2013)

Children's literature
Ma MacDonald (Women's Press, 1993; illustrated by Maryanne Barkhouse)

Non-fiction
"Joanne Arnott: World Poetry Day 2009: Part 1", May 7, 2009
Breasting the Waves: On Writing and Healing (Press Gang, 1995)

Blogs
Joanne Arnott
Vera Manuel Tribute

See also

List of writers from peoples indigenous to the Americas

References

External links 

1960 births
Living people
20th-century Canadian poets
21st-century Canadian poets
Canadian women poets
Canadian children's writers
Writers from Winnipeg
Writers from Vancouver
Canadian women children's writers
20th-century Canadian women writers
21st-century Canadian women writers
Chapbook writers